Patrick Farrell (1892 – 25 October 1969) was a Canadian fencer. He competed in the individual épée, individual sabre, and team épée events at the 1932 Summer Olympics.

References

External links
 

1892 births
1969 deaths
Sportspeople from Belfast
Canadian male fencers
Olympic fencers of Canada
Fencers at the 1932 Summer Olympics